Jean-Louis Murat (born 28 January 1952) is the pseudonym of the French singer/songwriter Jean-Louis Bergheaud. He spent much of his childhood with his grandparents in Murat-le-Quaire from which he got his pseudonym.

Biography

Jean-Louis Bergheaud was born in Chamalières, France to a father who was a carpenter and a non-professional musician. Further to his parents' divorce, he spent his whole youth in the isolated farm of his grandparents in Murat-le-Quaire, a village overviewing the thermal city of La Bourboule. 
From his earliest days, solitary and introverted, Jean-Louis Murat showed he was gifted for music and for many instruments, which will lead him to the local wind section at the age of 7 with his father, then to the conservatory brass class where he will improve his talent for singing too. 
At the same time at 15, his English teacher let him discover Soul and Jazz music and he met several Blues artists as John Lee Hooker, T-Bone Walker or Memphis Slim. Thanks to his English teacher, he continued studying against his father's advice. Keen on poetry as well as romantic and upheaval literature amongst others, Oscar Wilde, André Gide, D.H Lawrence or Vladimir Nabokov, he was the first one of his family to pass the Baccalauréat . Married at the age of 17, he joined the University of Clermont-Ferrand for a short period of time; he had a son and divorced when he was 19 and left in order to travel and lived by doing odd jobs in France and Europe all by himself, in the style of Jack Kerouac. 
He held a couple of positions between Paris and several French tourist spots; he was ski instructor in Avoriaz or a beach attendant in Saint-Tropez, and he finally went back to his village in 1977 at the age of 23 and devoted himself to music, that has never left so far.

Difficult beginnings 

With some Clermontois' friends from Clermont-Ferrand, he created a rock band called "Clara" with him as lead singer and songwriter. He also played saxophone and guitar in the band. William Sheller noticed them and invited them to do a couple of his opening acts and then employed them as musicians for a while. The band split and thanks to William Sheller, Jean-Louis Berghaud at the age of 27, in 1981 (under the name of Murat) he recorded a 45 rpm record including 3 songs, called Suicidez-vous, Le Peuple est mort with Pathé Marconi EMI, with Jean-Baptiste Mondino's photo as cover of the sleeve; critiques were positive but the sales did not take off. The French radio station  Europe 1 censored the song since a girl was said to commit suicide because of it. A mini eponymous album followed in 1982 including 6 songs, under the name of Murat and an album in 1984 called Passions Pivées garnered very low sales (2,000 copies), and after a tour with Charlélie Couture, his record label withdrew the contract. At the time he was around thirty.

Growing success 

In 1985, Jean-Louis Murat did some recording with CBS but none of the discs came out, then the year after, he jumped on the opportunity to record at Virgin Records and in 1988, the 45 rpm record Si je devais manquer de toi came out. This one met with some success, allowing the singer to start being recognized at last. His success was confirmed the sales of his new album which came out in 1989, called Cheyenne Autumn. It was recorded in London and included other singles which were also successful (L'Ange Déchu; Te Garder Près de Moi).

This beginning of fame brought him to be noticed by the movie industry, so Jean-Louis Murat appeared in 1990 as an actor in a film by Jacques Doillon who offered him a role in La vengeance d’une femme with Isabelle Huppert and Béatrice Dalle. 
But what made him definitely known in the eyes of a wider public is the single "Regrets" (in duet with Mylène Farmer) in 1991 (No. 3 in Top 50 and more than 300,000 copies sold), while he was turning 40. At that same time, his new studio album came out, Le Manteau de Pluie. His titles Col de la Croix-Morand and Sentiment Nouveau met with a great success; Sentiment nouveau entered the top 50 position in the early 1992's. Since then, his albums have regularly been into the French Top 20.

Deeply attached to the Auvergne where he lives, countryside and nature give him a very personal poetic inspiration. Very prolific, guitar player and singer with a typical tone, Jean-Louis Murat writes, produces and publishes more than one album a year including Venus in 1993, Dolorès in 1996, most of his albums are followed by long tours characterized by an interesting musical work, none of the tours looks like the previous one, those give birth to live album as Murat Live in 1995, Live in Dolores in 1966 or Muragostang in 2000. He likes to being surrounded with his family and relatives in order to be helped when he creates and when he moves around. As for movies side, he was on the bill of a film in 1996, Mademoiselle personne, especially with Elodie Bouchez and Romain Duris ; he is actually behind this full-length feature film (nevertheless whose broadcasting will be limited) presented as a musical movie (produced by Pascal Bailly), whose soundtrack he composed.

In March 2013 his album Toboggan came out and in October 2014, the follow-up album called Babel came out, recorded with Delano Orchestra band.

Personal life
Interested in Buddhism, Murat got involved in the Tibetan cause.

Discography 
(For peak positions of albums and singles, refer to )

Albums 
 1981: Suicidez-vous, le peuple est mort !
 1982: Murat
 1984: Passions privées
 1989: Cheyenne autumn
 1991: Murat en plein air
 1991: Le Manteau de pluie
 1991: Murat 82...84
 1993: Vénus
 1994: Face Nord
 1995: Mademoiselle Personne
 1995: Murat Live
 1996: Dolorès
 1998: Live in Dolorès
 1999: Mustango
 2000: Muragostang
 2001: Madame Deshoulières (in collaboration with Isabelle Huppert)
 2002: Le Moujik et sa femme
 2003: Lilith
 2004: A bird on a poire (in collaboration with Jennifer Charles, and Fred Jimenez)
 2005: Moscou (Москва)
 2005: 1829
 2006: Taormina
 2007: Charles et Léo (poems by Charles Baudelaire set to music by Léo Ferré)
 2008: Tristan
 2009: Le Cours ordinaire des choses
 2011: Grand lièvre
 2013: Toboggan
 2014: Babel (in collaboration with the Delano Orchestra)
 2016: Morituri
 2017: Travaux sur la N89
 2018: Il francese
 2019: Innamorato
 2020: Baby Love
 2021: La Vraie Vie De Buck John

EPs 
 Sentiment nouveau... (1991, 5 tracks)
 Au Mont Sans-Soucis (2000 5 tracks)
 Polly Jean (2000 8 tracks)
 L'au-delà (2002 4 tracks)
 Le Cri du Papillon (2003 4 tracks)
 Mashpotétisés (2004 4 tracks)
Live aux PIAS Nites (2015 5 tracks)

External links
 

1952 births
Living people
French male singers
Virgin Records artists